Mariusz Pawelec (born April 14, 1986 in Lublin) is a Polish footballer who plays as a defender for Śląsk Wrocław II.

References

External links
 
 

1986 births
Living people
Śląsk Wrocław players
Górnik Łęczna players
Górnik Zabrze players
Ekstraklasa players
II liga players
III liga players
Polish footballers
Poland under-21 international footballers
Sportspeople from Lublin
Poland international footballers
Association football defenders